MacKillop Catholic College is a Catholic co-educational secondary school located in Palmerston, Northern Territory, Australia. The College opened in 2012 and provides a religious and general education for students from Year 7 to Year 12.

The college is named after Mary MacKillop, Australia's first saint. It is located at the World War II site of the 16 Mile Camp.

MacKillop Catholic College is the home ground of the MacKillop Saints Rugby Club and MASH Netball Club.

See also 

 List of schools in the Northern Territory

References 

Catholic secondary schools in Darwin, Northern Territory
2012 establishments in Australia
Educational institutions established in 2012
Palmerston, Northern Territory